Bethania Almánzar Sosa (born February 11, 1987, in Bonao) is a female beach volleyball and volleyball player from the Dominican Republic. She twice won the NORCECA Beach Volleyball Circuit 2007, partnering Margarita Suero.

Career
Almánzar played with the club Los Prados from 2004 to 2006, winning the 2005 Dominican Metropolitan League with this club.

She trained in 2005 with the senior national indoor team in 2005, since the team split under the guidance of the Cuban trainer Ismael Ortega just before the 2006 FIVB World Championship qualification.

Almánzar won the silver medal during the 2006 National Games, playing with the North Region.

She twice won the silver medal in the women's competition at the NORCECA Beach Volleyball Circuit 2007 in Guatemala City and Carolina, Puerto Rico, partnering Margarita Suero.

Playing with Daniela Rosario, she won the Dominican Republic National Beach Volleyball Tour in 2008.

In Indoor volleyball, she won the bronze medal in 2007 and 2008 at the Dominican Republic Volleyball League playing with Santiago.

She won the 2008 Bonao Athlete of the Year award for her performance during 2008, and she was also contending for her province to the "Premio Nacional de la Juventud", for Sport Achievements.

Almánzar participated during the 2009 Holy Week Sport Festival held in Hato Mayor, playing Beach Volleyball (three) with Dahiana Burgos and Karla Echenique, winning the Silver Medal of the event. She was enlisted for the national beach volleyball team under the guidance of the Cuban coach Carlos Suarez training for the 2010 Central American and Caribbean Games. She played indoor volleyball with the Dominican Republic National team that won the silver medal at the 2010 Central American and Caribbean University Games.

She played the 2011 Santiago Intermunicipal Tournament with Navarrete, leading them to win the preliminary round with a 6–0 mark.

She won the 2014 Hato Mayor Volleyball tournament gold medal with Darielis Ravelo and Soranyi Aquino. Almánzar played with the club Manoguayabo in the 2015 Santo Domingo volleyball tournament. In August 2016 she traveled to New York with the BanReservas team to play the Bameso USA International tournament, winning the first place.

Almánzar played with Iris Santos and Anahí Lebrón the 2017 Hato Mayor Beach Volleyball Tournament, were they were beaten by Ana Esther Lara, Juana González and Dahiana Burgos, settling with the tournaments silver medal. She later joined the Bonao club in the 2017 North Central ligue championship, were her team claime the bronze medal and she later won the X Bonao Reinforced Volleyball tournament with Plamed.

Playing with Esmeralda Ramírez and Pamela Suárez she won the Hato Mayor Beach Volleyball Tournament, representing INAPA.

With the Banreservas team, he won undefeated the IX Bameso USA International Tournament, held in the Riverbank State Park in New York City. She played with the INAPA indoor team, winning in their 57th anniversary tournament. She was awarded Best Scorer and Most Valuable Player. Almánzar won the XLV Santiago Intermunicipal Volleyball Tournament championship and the Best Spiker individual award, playing with Cienfuegos. She won the silver medal and the Best Spiker award, playing with Bonao in the Cibao Cup.

She won the silver medal in the 2020 National Championship, when her club, Santiago lost 1-3 the final match to National District.

Almánzar helped Los Mina to win the Santo Domingo Superior Tournament, she was elected Most Valuable Player. She then helped Bonao to win the 2021 version of the Cibao Cup. Later Almanzar played with Caribeñas-New Horizons VC at the Dominican Republic Superior Volleyball League from the National District, she ended up winning the tournament second place when her team was defeated 0–3 in the final series by Cristo Rey.

Clubs
  Los Prados (2004–2006)
  Boca Chica (2006)
  Santiago (2007–2008)
  Bonao (2010)
  Navarrete (2011)
  Manoguayabo (2014-2015)
  BanReservas (2016)
  Bonao (2017)
  Plamed (2017)
  BanReservas (2019)
  Inapa (2019)
  Bonao (2019)
  Santiago (2020)
  Los Mina (2021)
  Bonao (2021)
  Caribeñas-New Horizons VC (2021)

Awards

Individual
 2008 Unión Deportiva Monseñor Nouel "Athlete of the Year"
 2019 Santiago Intermunicipal Tournament "Best Spiker"
 2019 Cibao Cup "Best Spiker"
 2021 Santo Domingo Superior Tournament "Most Valuable Player"

Beach Vollebyall
 2007 NORCECA Beach Volleyball Circuit Guatemala  Silver Medal
 2007 NORCECA Beach Volleyball Circuit Puerto Rico  Silver Medal
 2008 Dominican Republic National Beach Volleyball Tour  Gold Medal
 2009 Hato Mayor Beach Volleyball Tournament  Silver Medal
 2014 Hato Mayor Beach Volleyball Tournament  Gold Medal
 2015 Hato Mayor Beach Volleyball Tournament  Bronze Medal
 2016 Hato Mayor Beach Volleyball Tournament  Silver Medal
 2017 Hato Mayor Beach Volleyball Tournament  Silver Medal
 2019 Hato Mayor Beach Volleyball Tournament  Gold Medal

Clubs
 2005 Dominican Metropolitan League –  Champion, with Los Prados
 2005 Santo Domingo Superior Tournament –  Champion, with Boca Chica
 2007 Dominican Republic Volleyball League – 3rd Place, with Santiago
 2008 Dominican Republic Volleyball League – 3rd Place, with Santiago
 2010 Dominican Republic Volleyball League – 3rd Place, with Bonao
 2019 Santiago Intermunicipal Tournament –  Champion, with Cienfuegos
 2019 Cibao Cup – 2nd Place, with Bonao
 2020 National Championship – 2nd Place, with Santiago
 2021 Santo Domingo Superior Tournament –  Champion, with Los Mina
 2021 Cibao Cup –  Champion, with Bonao
 2021 Dominican Republic Superior Volleyball League – 2nd Place, with Caribeñas-New Horizons

References

External links
 

1987 births
Living people
People from Bonao
Dominican Republic beach volleyball players
Dominican Republic women's volleyball players
Women's beach volleyball players